Danny Venter (born 19 May 1987) is a South African professional soccer player who currently plays for Premier Soccer League club Golden Arrows as a midfielder.

References

External links

1987 births
Living people
Association football midfielders
People from Klerksdorp
South African soccer players
Garankuwa United F.C. players
Bloemfontein Celtic F.C. players
Free State Stars F.C. players
Lamontville Golden Arrows F.C. players